Nakusp Secondary is a public high school in Nakusp, British Columbia part of School District 10 Arrow Lakes.

High schools in British Columbia
Educational institutions in Canada with year of establishment missing